The Southern District (Meḥoz HaDarom) is one of Israel's six administrative districts, the largest in terms of land area but the most sparsely populated. It covers most of the Negev desert, as well as the Arava valley. The population of the Southern District is 1,086,240 and its area is 14,185 km2. Its population is 79.66% Jewish and 12.72% Arab (mostly Muslim), with 7.62% of other origins. 

The district capital is Beersheba, while the largest city is Ashdod. Beersheba's dormitory towns of Omer, Meitar, and Lehavim are affluent on an Israel scale, while the development towns of Dimona, Sderot, Netivot, Ofakim, and Yeruham and the seven Bedouin cities are lower on the socio-economic scale.

Administrative local authorities

Some villages do not fall under the jurisdiction of a regional council. These include:

 Mahane Yatir
 Umm al-Hiran (unrecognised Bedouin village)

See also
List of cities in Israel
Arab localities in Israel
Gaza Strip

References